A craton is an ancient part of the Earth's continental crust which has been more or less stable since Precambrian times. Cratons whose ancient rocks are widely exposed at the surface, often with relatively subdued relief, are known as shields. If the ancient rocks are largely overlain by a cover of younger rocks then the 'hidden' craton may be referred to as a platform.

List of shields
Western Ethiopian Shield
Amazonian Shield of central South America
Guiana Shield
Guaporé or Central Brazilian Shield
The Angaran Shield of West Siberia
Arabian-Nubian Shield
(Western) Australian Shield
Baltic Shield of Scandinavia and Eastern Europe
Canadian Shield a.k.a. Laurentian Shield
The China-Korean Shield containing the North China Craton
The East Antarctic Shield containing the East Antarctic Craton
Indian Shield
Man Shield

List of named cratons 

Listed by modern continent and Gondwana, include:

West Gondwana

South America 
Amazonian Craton 
Guiana Shield
Amazonian Shield
Sao Francisco Craton (Congo Craton)
Rio Apa Craton
Río de la Plata Craton
Arequipa–Antofalla Craton
São Luís cratonic fragment 
Luís Alves cratonic fragment

Africa 
West African Craton 
East Saharan Meta-craton
Congo Craton, central southern Africa
Bangweulu Block, Zambia
Tanzanian Craton
Kalahari Craton
Kaapvaal Craton, South Africa (3.6–2.5 Ga)
Zimbabwe Craton (3.5 Ga)
Sebakwe Craton

Antarctic-East African Orogen 
Arabian plate
Part of the Arabian–Nubian Shield
Western Ethiopian Shield
Eastern Ethiopian Shield (part of the Somali Plate)
Part of Madagascar

East Gondwana

Indian Subcontinent 
Indian Craton
Aravalli Craton, India  
Bundelkand Craton, India
Dharwar Craton, India (3.4–2.6 Ga)
Singhbhum Craton, India
Bastar Craton, India

Antarctica 
East Antarctic Craton

Australia 
Altjawarra Craton
Central Craton
Curnamona Craton, South Australia
Gawler Craton, central South Australia
Pilbara Craton, Western Australia
Yilgarn Craton, Western Australia (4.4 Ga)

North America
 
Canadian Shield (or Laurentian Shield)
Churchill Craton
Hearne Craton
Nain Craton (part of North Atlantic Craton)
North American Craton (Laurentia)
Rae Craton
Sask Craton
Sclavia Craton
Slave Craton, Northwest Territories, Canada (4.03–3.5 Ga)
Superior Craton, Canada and northern United States (3.7–2.7 Ga)
Wyoming Craton

Eurasia

Eastern Eurasia
East China Craton
North China Craton (sometimes called Sino-Korean Craton), (2.5 Ga)
South China Craton (also known as Yangtze Craton)
Siberian Craton, sometimes called Angara Craton.
Aldan Shield
Anabar Shield
Tarim Craton, China

Northern and Eastern Europe
East European Craton, the core of Baltica
Volgo-Uralian Craton, Russia (3.0–2.7 Ga)
Baltic Shield, part of the East European Craton; Fennoscandian Shield, the exposed Northwestern part of the Baltic Shield in Norway, Sweden and Finland (3.1 Ga)
Karelian Craton, part of the Fennoscandian Shield in Southeast Finland and Karelia Russia, (3.4 Ga)
Kola Craton, part of the Fennoscandian Shield, Kola Peninsula, Northwest Russia
Belomorian Craton, part of the Fennoscandian Shield, between the Karelian and Kola cratons
Sarmatian Craton (3.7–2.8 Ga)
Ukrainian Shield
Midlands Microcraton of England and Wales
North Atlantic Craton

See also 
List of paleocontinents

References

Shields and cratons

fr:Craton